Krishnasami Thulasiah Vandayar (11 May 1929 – 17 May 2021) was an Indian politician and head of the Poondi estate in the Thanjavur district of Tamil Nadu, India. He was the member of Lok Sabha for Thanjavur from 1991 to 1996. He was the chairman of the Managing Committee of the AVVM Pushpam College. He died on 17 May 2021 (Monday) at Chennai Saligram.

Early life 

Vandayar was born on 11 May 1929 to A. Krishnasami Vandayar, the zamindar of Poondi. He was educated at the Loyola College, Chennai.

Personal life 

Vandayar married Padmavathi and had one son T Krishnasamy Vandayar and a daughter.

Political career 

Vandayar was a member of the Indian National Congress from an early age. In the 1991 Lok Sabha elections, he was elected from the Thanjavur Lok Sabha constituency defeating S. S. Palanimanickam of the Dravida Munnetra Kazhagam party. He served till the 1996 elections which he lost. Vandayar served as the president of the Thanjavur District Congress Committee.

References

External links 
https://www.vikatan.com/news/tamilnadu/article-about-thulasi-ayya-vandayar-who-passed-away-17th-may-2021

1929 births
2021 deaths
India MPs 1991–1996
Lok Sabha members from Tamil Nadu
Indian National Congress politicians from Tamil Nadu
People from Thanjavur district
Loyola College, Chennai alumni